The name Evan has been used to name tropical cyclones 3 times, once within the Australian region and twice within the South Pacific basin.

Australian region
Tropical Cyclone Evan (2004), which brought flooding to Groote Eylandt and the Northern Territory.

South Pacific
Severe Tropical Cyclone Evan (1997), which impacted waters northeast of New Zealand.
Cyclone Evan (2012), which impacted Fiji, Western Samoa, American Samoa, Tonga

South Pacific cyclone set index articles
Australian region cyclone set index articles